Mary Mairs-Chapot (born June 20, 1944) is an American equestrian. She competed at the 1964 Summer Olympics and the 1968 Summer Olympics.

References

1944 births
Living people
American female equestrians
Olympic equestrians of the United States
Equestrians at the 1964 Summer Olympics
Equestrians at the 1968 Summer Olympics
Pan American Games medalists in equestrian
Pan American Games gold medalists for the United States
Equestrians at the 1963 Pan American Games
Equestrians at the 1967 Pan American Games
Sportspeople from Pasadena, California
Medalists at the 1963 Pan American Games